Abu’l-Qāsim ʿAlī ibn Aḥmad al-Jarjarāʾī was a Fatimid official of Iraqi origin, who served as the Fatimid vizier from 1027 until his death on 27 March 1045.

As his nisba shows, he came from the locality of Jarjaraya, south of Baghdad. He came to Egypt along with his brother Abu'l-Barakat al-Husayn al-Jarjara'i, and held a succession of offices in the Fatimid bureaucracy. He entered the service of Sitt al-Mulk, before becoming secretary to the police chief of Cairo. He was convicted of disloyalty when he opened letters of the secret services in 1013, as a result of which his hands were cut off. However the Caliph al-Hakim soon regretted this harsh punishment, and took him back into the palace and promoted him to high office.

In 1015/6 he was appointed head of the dīwān al-nafaḳāt (bureau of expenditure), before rising to the post of wāsiṭa (the official intermediary between Caliph and the people) in 1021/2, and finally achieving the post of vizier in 1027. He held the post under the caliphs Ali az-Zahir and al-Mustansir until his death in March 1045.

During his tenure, after the pacification of Syria by Anushtakin al-Dizbari, al-Jarjara'i, concerned himself with improving relations with the Byzantine Empire. A ceasefire had been in place since 1027, and after fresh fighting in 1036 a peace treaty was agreed. The main point of contention was the suzerainty over the Emirate of the Mirdasids in Aleppo, which both powers made claim to. In practice a kind of dual control came into operation.

Al-Jarjara'i assumed the regency during Caliph al-Mustansir's early reign, though his rule was moderated for its duration by the influence of the caliph's powerful mother Rasad.

References

Sources

 
 

1045 deaths
11th-century Arabs
Iraqi amputees
Iraqi Shia Muslims
Regents
Regents of Egypt
Year of birth unknown
11th-century people from the Fatimid Caliphate
Viziers of the Fatimid Caliphate